Maria Prytz (born 18 October 1976; née Engholm) is a Swedish curler from Härnösand. Prytz was the longtime alternate player for the Anette Norberg rink.

Career
Prytz's first two trips to the World Junior Curling Championships were as the alternate for the Margaretha Lindahl team in 1994 and 1995. They won the bronze medal and the silver medal respectively. She went to the World Juniors once again in 1997, this time throwing fourth stones for Margaretha Sigfridsson. The team won the silver medal. Prytz returned to the World Juniors in 1998, this time playing third for Matila Mattsson. They would win a bronze medal.

After juniors, Prytz went back to being the alternate for Lindahl, and won a silver medal at the 1999 European Curling Championships. She then joined the Norberg rink as her alternate. With Norberg, she would win gold medals at the 2003 and 2007 European Curling Championships, a silver medal at the 2001 World Curling Championships, and a bronze medal at the 2003 World Championship. Prytz also played for Sigfridsson once again during this period, and won a silver medal at the 2002 World Championships, throwing fourth stones for the team.

After her stint as Norberg's alternate, Prytz joined the Stina Viktorsson rink, playing third for her. However, they were not successful, and she once again teamed up with Sigfridsson, and once again threw last stones for the team. This team would be more successful, and they won a silver medal at the 2011 European Curling Championships.

In 2009 she was inducted into the Swedish Curling Hall of Fame.

Personal life
Prytz works as a public relations manager. She has two children.

References

External links
 
 

Living people
1976 births
People from Härnösand
People from Härjedalen
Swedish female curlers
Olympic curlers of Sweden
Olympic silver medalists for Sweden
Olympic medalists in curling
Curlers at the 2014 Winter Olympics
Medalists at the 2014 Winter Olympics
European curling champions
Swedish curling champions
Swedish curling coaches
Sportspeople from Västernorrland County